The 1920–21 Sheffield Shield season was the 25th season of the Sheffield Shield, the domestic first-class cricket competition of Australia. New South Wales won the championship.

Table

Statistics

Most Runs
Warren Bardsley 648

Most Wickets
Arthur Mailey 26

Notable events
New South Wales set the record, which still stands, for the highest second innings total by a team in a first-class match, when scoring 770 against South Australia at Adelaide in January 1921. As well as this total, South Australia conceded innings totals of 639, 724 and 802 in their three other matches.

References

External links
 Season at ESPN Cricinfo

Sheffield Shield
Sheffield Shield
Sheffield Shield seasons